Matthew Acosta (born November 14, 2002) is an American soccer player who plays as a midfielder for Rutgers Scarlet Knights.

Career
Acosta began his career in the youth academy of the New York Red Bulls in 2013. In March 2021, Acosta was included in the pre-season roster of Red Bulls reserve side New York Red Bulls II. Raised in the Annandale section of Clinton Township, New Jersey, Acosta announced in April 2021 that he would commit to playing college soccer for the Rutgers Scarlet Knights for the 2021 season.

On April 30, 2021, Acosta made his senior debut for Red Bulls II in the USL Championship against Hartford Athletic, starting in the 2–3 defeat.

In the fall of 2021, Acosta went to play college soccer at Rutgers University.

Career statistics

References

External links
 Profile at U.S. Soccer Development Academy

2002 births
Living people
People from Clinton Township, New Jersey
Sportspeople from Hunterdon County, New Jersey
Association football midfielders
New York Red Bulls II players
USL Championship players
Soccer players from New Jersey
Rutgers Scarlet Knights men's soccer players
American soccer players